Donald Barry Clarke (10 November 1933 – 29 December 2002) was a New Zealand rugby union player who played 89 times (31 of these were test matches) as a New Zealand international from 1956 until 1964. He was best known for his phenomenal goal kicking ability that earned him the nickname "The Boot". He was born at the small settlement of Pihama, near Ōpunake in the Taranaki Region.

Rugby career

In 1956 he helped the Waikato side to a 14–10 victory over the touring South African Springbok side. This helped his cause in being selected to play in the third All Black test match of the Springbok tour. Over his entire All Black career Clarke scored 781 points, a record that stood for 24 years until it was broken by Grant Fox in 1988.

Clarke had four brothers, Ian, Douglas, Brian and Graeme all of whom also represented Waikato. Only once did they all appear for Waikato in the same match, at Te Aroha in 1961.

A highlight of his career was to play for the Eastwood Rugby Club (Sydney, Australia) in an exhibition match. "One of the best days of my life" Clarke commented at the after match function. In July 1965 Clarke also helped Hornsby Rugby beat Mosman at Waitara Oval by scoring a try and demonstrating his kicking skills by kicking two penalties and three conversions.

Cricket career

Clarke also played 27 first-class cricket matches as a right-arm opening bowler, mostly for Auckland and Northern Districts, taking five or more wickets in an innings on four occasions. His best performance came for Northern Districts against Central Districts in January 1963, when he claimed 8/37 in the second innings.
At the time, this was a record innings return for Northern Districts in first-class cricket, although it was beaten by Gren Alabaster's 8/30 just two months later.

Personal life

Clarke married in 1962 in Morrinsville. In 1977 he moved to South Africa, together with wife Patsy, son Glen and daughters Leigh and Shelley. There he set up a tree-felling business. In 1997, he was seriously injured in a motor vehicle accident, when a 15-tonne truck hit his utility vehicle. He was diagnosed with melanoma in March 2001, from which he died on 29 December 2002.

See also

 List of Auckland representative cricketers

References

External links

Don Clarke | Rugby Database Profile
Cricket.org: Statistics for Donald Clarke
 

1933 births
2002 deaths
Auckland cricketers
New Zealand cricketers
New Zealand emigrants to South Africa
New Zealand international rugby union players
New Zealand rugby union players
North Island cricketers
Northern Districts cricketers
Rugby union fullbacks
Rugby union players from Taranaki
Waikato rugby union players
World Rugby Hall of Fame inductees